Poretskoye is a rural locality (a selo) in Pavlovskoye Rural Settlement, Suzdalsky District, Vladimir Oblast, Russia. The population was 795 as of 2010. There are 17 streets.

Geography 
Poretskoye is located on the Nerl River, 21 km southeast of Suzdal (the district's administrative centre) by road. Sokol is the nearest rural locality.

References 

Rural localities in Suzdalsky District
Vladimirsky Uyezd